Peter John Streams  (born 8 March 1935) is a former British diplomat.

Streams was British Ambassador to Honduras from 1989 to 1991. He served as British Ambassador to Sudan from 1991 to 1994.

He was expelled in December 1993 after the Archbishop of Canterbury, George Carey, refused to visit the capital Khartoum during a tour of the country and spent much of his time in the rebel-held south. After talks in London hosted by Douglas Hogg, relations were eventually restored in 1995 with the appointment of Alan Goulty.

Honours
  Companion of the Order of St Michael and St George (CMG) - 1986

References

1935 births
Living people
Members of HM Diplomatic Service
Ambassadors of the United Kingdom to Sudan
Companions of the Order of St Michael and St George
20th-century British diplomats